About Scout (originally titled Scout) is a 2015 American comedy-drama film directed and written by Laurie Weltz. The film stars India Ennenga, James Frecheville, Nikki Reed, Danny Glover and Ellen Burstyn. The film had its world premiere at the Newport Beach Film Festival on April 25, 2015. It was scheduled to be released on March 11, 2016, in a limited release and through video on demand by Breaking Glass Pictures and Reel Red Films.

Premise 
A 15-year-old girl named Scout (India Ennenga), travels with a suicidal man Sam (James Frecheville), to find her young little sister Lulu (Onata Aprile) whilst avoiding Child Services (Danny Glover).

Cast
 India Ennenga as Scout Havers
 James Frecheville as Sam Prescott
 Nikki Reed as Georgie
 Danny Glover as "Red" Freston
 Ellen Burstyn as Gram
 Jane Seymour as Gloria Prescott
 Tim Guinee as Ray
 Onata Aprile as Tallulah "Lulu" Havers'
 Shelley Hennig as Melinda
 Kevin Scott Allen as Ride Operator

Production 
On October 7, 2013, it was announced that Laurie Weltz would be directing a film "Scout", which Beverley A. Gordon, Nic Emiliani and Dwjuan Fox would produce. While the film's stars would be India Ennenga, Nikki Reed, Danny Glover, Ellen Burstyn, James Frecheville, Onata Aprile and Shelley Hennig. On October 28, Jane Seymour and Tim Guinee joined the cast of the film. BrownBag Pictures and Decipher Entertainment would handle finance and production.

Filming 
The filming began in October 2013 in Los Angeles, Reed was spotted there filming some scenes.

Release
The film had its world premiere at the Newport Beach Film Festival on April 25, 2015. In November 2015, it was announced that Reel Red Films and Breaking Glass Pictures had acquired U.S distribution rights to the film, with a planned March 2016 release. The film was scheduled to be released on March 11, 2016, in a limited release and through video on demand.

References

External links 
 
 

Films shot in Los Angeles
Films set in Los Angeles
American road comedy-drama films
2010s road comedy-drama films
Films about missing people
Films about families
2010s English-language films
2010s American films